Maurice Browning (11 May 1919 – 4 December 1983) was a British television actor.

He appeared in several cult television series, including The Avengers, The Saint, The Champions and Doctor Who. His film credits included roles in The Last Days of Dolwyn (1949), The Party's Over (1965), Where the Bullets Fly (1966) and The Assassination Bureau (1969).

Browning also made an adaptation of the Gilbert and Sullivan comic opera The Mikado that was filmed in 1963 as The Cool Mikado, and supplied the libretto for Twenty Minutes South and The Bright Arcade.

Filmography
The Last Days of Dolwyn (1949) - Huw 
Interpol (1957) - Man with tick
Beyond the Curtain (1960) - Contact Man (uncredited)
The Party's Over (1965) - Tutzi
Ambush at Devil's Gap (1966) - Severs
Where the Bullets Fly (1966) - Cherub
Casino Royale (1967) - Charly (Temple monk) (uncredited)
The Assassination Bureau (1969) - Bureau Member (uncredited)

External links

Maurice Browning at Theatricalia

1919 births
1983 deaths
British male television actors
20th-century British male actors
British male film actors